Expatriate is a restaurant and cocktail bar in northeast Portland, Oregon's Concordia neighborhood, in the United States.

Thrillist says, "Arguably one of Portland's most popular cocktail bars, the bartenders at Expatriate are professionally trained mixologists who, in addition to perfecting the classics, have a knack for creating custom or experimental drinks. And in addition to these carefully-crafted concoctions, the bar also offers a menu of refined bar bites. The Prohibition-era vibe is evident from the gold and red decor that is way more sexy than kitschy."

References

External links

 Expatriate at Bon Appétit
 Expatriate at the Food Network
 Expatriate at Zomato

Concordia, Portland, Oregon
Restaurants in Portland, Oregon
Year of establishment missing